Sweet'n Low (stylized as Sweet'N Low) is a brand of artificial sweetener made primarily from granulated saccharin. It also contains dextrose and cream of tartar, and is distributed primarily in packets. There have been over 500 billion Sweet'N Low packets produced.

The "SWEET'N LOW" wording and musical staff logo have US trademark registration number 3,317,421.

In Canada, Sweet'n Low is made from sodium cyclamate rather than saccharin. Although saccharin was not allowed as a food additive in Canada beginning in 1977 when studies surfaced showing bladder cancer in laboratory rats that had been given the additive, in 2014, Canada lifted this ban when those studies were proven to be flawed.

Sweet'n Low has been licensed to Bernard Food Industries for a line of low-calorie baking mixes.

History
Saccharin was discovered in 1878 by Constantin Fahlberg, a chemist working on coal tar derivatives at the Johns Hopkins University. Although saccharin was commercialized not long after its discovery, it was not until decades later that its use became widespread. Sweet'n Low was first introduced in 1957 by Benjamin Eisenstadt, formerly proprietor of a Brooklyn Navy Yard cafeteria, and his son, Marvin Eisenstadt. The elder Eisenstadt had earlier invented the sugar packet, but neglected to patent it, and artificial sweetener packets were an outgrowth of that business. The two were the first to market and distribute the sugar substitute in powdered form. Their distribution company, Cumberland Packing Corporation, still controls the product. The business is still based on the site of Ben's original diner.

Advertising
In 2005, Cumberland Packing Corporation made a sponsorship deal with Metro Goldwyn Mayer, which at the time was about to be ready for the 2006 spy comedy film remake The Pink Panther. As a result, the Pink Panther animated character made an appearance in two promotional commercials, one for the 2006 film and the other for the remake's sequel, The Pink Panther 2, and on the sweetener's iconic pink packets and its box packaging.

Brand name derivation
The name "Sweet'n Low" derives from an 1863 song by Sir Joseph Barnby, which took both its title and lyrics from an Alfred Lord Tennyson poem, entitled The Princess: Sweet and Low.

References

External links

 Official US site
 Official UK site

Sugar substitutes
Products introduced in 1957
Brand name diet products